Nick Griffin (born December 23, 1966) is an American comedian and writer.

Griffin began his stand up career at the age of 19 in 1987 in Kansas City, before moving to New York in 1990, performing in midnight shows at Greenwich Village. He then moved to Los Angeles, becoming a staff writer for The Keenen Ivory Wayans Show in 1997 and later became the head writer for Bobby Slayton and Sue Murphy's morning radio show.

Griffin made his first major TV appearance on The Late Late Show with Craig Kilborn, and went on to become a regular on Premium Blend. He moved back to New York in 2006 and has performed on the Late Show with David Letterman Conan, The Late Late Show with Craig Ferguson, and in May 2016, The Late Show with Stephen Colbert.

References

External links 

Living people
American comedy writers
American stand-up comedians
Year of birth missing (living people)
20th-century American comedians
21st-century American comedians